Umara Sinhawansa (Sinhala: උමාරා සිංහවංශ, born 14 March 1989) is a Sri Lankan pop, R&B and jazz singer. She is also a songwriter, producer, and audio engineer.

Early life 
She was born into a family of professional musicians, father Tony Sinhawansa and mother Ayesha Sinhawansa, who allowed her to be exposed to all genres of music from jazz to hip hop to classic to RnB. She has one sister (Umaria Sinhawansa) and two brothers. Umara was educated at Muslim Ladies’ College and represented Sri Lanka in three international singing competitions, and won first prize at the All-Island Singing Competition of Sri Lanka.

Career 
She did her first professional recording at the age of 10 along with her sister Umaria  and made her first public performance at the age of 13. Later on Umara teamed up with the popular singing duo Bhathiya and Santhush (BNS) and was the designated audio engineer when they toured. She has a vocal range of four and a half octaves. Some of her chart toppers are "Wassanayata","Shaheena", "Sihina ko" and "Malak Thibuna" with Chithral Somapla and Kasthuri. After her marriage to Risky Fahmi, she moved to Hong Kong, where she mastered the art of jazz under Dylan Lye. During a 6-year stint in Hong Kong, she performed in the Chinese market and established herself as a Sri Lankan vocalist while performing with her band Proteus. After returning from Hong Kong in 2017, Umara launched her academy, Umara Music Studio (UMS) which provides music and vocal training for students of all ages.

Awards and accomplishments 

 Represented Sri Lanka at two international singing competitions held in Kazakhstan and China.
 Won the Bronze Award at the Crimea Music Festival held in Ukraine (2011), singing along with her sister Umaria.
 Became youngest female artist in Sri Lanka to have collaborated with the international artist Shankar Mahadevan (Shankar Ehsaan Loy)

Television shows

Filmography (Music department)

References 

1989 births
Living people
Women pop singers
21st-century Sri Lankan women singers
20th-century Sri Lankan women singers
Contemporary R&B singers
Women jazz singers
Sri Lankan singer-songwriters
Women record producers
Sri Lankan record producers
Women audio engineers
People from Colombo
Sri Lankan playback singers